Scheuermann Spur is a broad ice-covered limb of the Darwin Mountains between the head of the Hatherton Glacier and the west end of Prebble Icefalls. The feature has a relatively flat summit area (about 1600 m) that tapers southward to a narrow snout. A rock cliff marks the west side facing Hatherton Glacier. Named after Mike Scheuermann, Air Projects Specialist, Polar Programs, National Science Foundation (NSF), 1995–2001; former Navy liaison to OPP from U.S. Navy.

Ridges of Oates Land